The 2014 South American Para Games, officially known as the 1st Para-South American Games, was a multi-sport event held from 26 to 30 March 2014 in Santiago, Chile.

Participating nations
Eight nations competed in this edition of Para-South American Games. Numbers in parentheses indicate the number of athletes competing.

  Argentina (102)
  Brazil (81)
  Chile (103)
  Colombia (87)
  Ecuador (17)
  Peru (25)
  Uruguay
  Venezuela (118)

Sports
Seven sports were contested in this edition of Para-South American Games.
 Athletics  (92)
 Boccia  (7)
 Powerlifting  (9)
 Swimming  (54)
 Table tennis  (4)
 Wheelchair basketball  (2)
 Wheelchair tennis  (6)

Medal table
Argentina topped the medal table in the first edition of the Para-South American Games with 112 medals. The host nation, Chile, got 43 medals and finished in fifth place.

References

External links
 

Para-South American Games
Para-South American Games
Para-South American Games
Multi-sport events in Chile
Sport in Santiago
International sports competitions hosted by Chile
March 2014 sports events in South America